King Bailey Parsons Jr. (born June 11, 1950) is a former professional wrestler better known by his ring name Iceman King Parsons.

Professional wrestling career 
Parsons started wrestling in 1979 after being trained by Nick Kozak. King started for the National Wrestling Alliance (NWA)'s Paul Boesch Promotion in Houston, Texas. Boesch contacted Don Owen and was successful in landing a job for King in the NWA's Pacific Northwest territory. Both Don and Elton Owen promoted in Washington and Oregon. While in the promotion, he teamed with Rocky Johnson and won the tag team title. King moved to Barling, Arkansas and lived there while working for the Tulsa promotion and Leroy McGuirk circa 1978–79. King moved to Worland, Wyoming and wrestled for the Rocky Mountain Wrestling promotion for about a year, wrestling in Wyoming, Idaho, and Utah. Bill Ash booked all the talent and the matches.

In 1982, he moved on to Jim Crockett Promotions where he teamed with Porkchop Cash and feuded with Don Kernodle and Jim Nelson over the NWA Mid-Atlantic Tag Team Championship. In 1983, King then moved on to World Class Championship Wrestling. He feuded with the One Man Gang and Chris Adams. Parsons feuded with Freebird Buddy Roberts who cut his hair. They ended the feud late June 1983 with Parsons using the Freebird hair cream to render Roberts bald. In early December, 1983, Parsons was "kayfabe" burnt by Skandor Akbar's flame thrower in a match between him and Junkyard Dog vs The Super Destroyers Super Destroyer #1 & Super Destroyer #2 with Akbar ringside leaving Parson with a kayfabe disfigurement teeming with Brian Adias against the Super Destroyers. At WCCW Wrestling Star Wars in December 1983, Parsons would almost win the NWA American Tag Team Championship, but with the Super Destroyers throwing Adias over the top rope, The Super Destroyers would retain the belts.

He also formed "Rock 'n' Soul" with Buck Zumhofe and they had a big feud with The Super Destroyers. He wrestled briefly in the Texas All-Star Wrestling promotion in 1986 and formed the "Dream Team" with Tiger Conway, Jr. They feuded with Mike and Dizzy Golden.

Iceman then went on to the Universal Wrestling Federation, where he was snubbed out of a tag team title tournament in 1987. Parsons turned heel and feuded mostly with Adams and with Savannah Jack for many months, and his feud with Jack carried over to Ken Mantell's new Wild West Wrestling promotion. In late 1987, he joined Terry Gordy and Buddy Roberts, after Michael Hayes left the Fabulous Freebirds, to help them get revenge on him. Hayes teamed with Kerry and Kevin Von Erich and they had a long feud that eventually saw Gordy side with Hayes and the Von Erich's and Roberts leave the promotion. Parsons was known as the "Blackbird" during this feud and formed a trio called "The Blackbirds" with Perry "Action" Jackson and Harold T. Harris. In 1985, Parsons would win the WCWA American Heavyweight Championship defeating Chris Adams, later losing that title to Ravishing Rick Rude. In March 1988 Parsons defeated Kerry Von Erich for the World Class Heavyweight Championship in a highly controversial bout that actually saw the lights go out in the Dallas Sportatorium.

In the early-1990s, he moved over to the Herb Abrams-owned Universal Wrestling Federation and feuded with Colonel DeBeers over his treatment of African-American referee Larry Sampson, who was Parsons's storyline cousin. In 1992, Parsons went to the Global Wrestling Federation with Jackson as the Blackbirds managed by The Witch Dr Baboose and won the tag team title with him and also won the North American title, which was their top title. Parsons and Jackson feuded with The Ebony Experience. He also worked for the United States Wrestling Association where he was managed by Skandor Akbar and Percy Pringle. After the death of friend Chris Adams in 2001 and suffering a serious back injury from a car accident, Parsons cut back on his appearances. He is semi-retired, appearing from time to time with a few independent promotions in Texas.

On September 1, 2018 Parsons teamed with Marshall and Ross Von Erich defeating Tatanka, Kid Kash and Arrow Club Kyote at World Class Revolution.

Championships and accomplishments
Big D Wrestling
Big D Tag Team Championship (2 times) – with Action Jackson
Continental Wrestling Alliance
CWA Heavyweight Championship (1 time)
Extreme Pro Wrestling
EPW Texas Heavyweight Championship (1 time)
Global Wrestling Federation
GWF North American Heavyweight Championship (1 time)
GWF Tag Team Championship (1 time) – with Perry Jackson
Mid-Atlantic Championship Wrestling
NWA Mid-Atlantic Tag Team Championship (1 time) – with Porkchop Cash
National Class Wrestling
NCW Heavyweight Championship (1 time)
North American Wrestling Alliance
NAWA Heavyweight Championship (1 time)
Pacific Northwest Wrestling
NWA Pacific Northwest Tag Team Championship (1 time) – with Rocky Johnson
Pro Wrestling Illustrated
PWI ranked him # 69 of the 500 best singles wrestlers during the "PWI 500" in 1991
PWI ranked him # 249 of the 500 best singles wrestlers during the "PWI Years" in 2003
Texas All-Star Wrestling
Texas All-Star USA Tag Team Championship (2 times) – with Tiger Conway Jr.
Texas Wrestling Federation
TWF Asian Heavyweight Championship (1 time)
Ultimate Wrestling Federation
UWF Heavyweight Championship (1 time)
World Class Championship Wrestling / World Class Wrestling Association
NWA American Heavyweight Championship (1 time)
NWA American Tag Team Championship (3 times) – with Brian Adias (1) and Buck Zumhofe (2)
WCCW Television Championship (4 times)
WCWA Texas Heavyweight Championship (1 time)
WCWA World Heavyweight Championship (1 time)
WCWA World Six-Man Tag Team Championship (1 time) – with Terry Gordy and Buddy Roberts
WCWA World Tag Team Championship (1 time) – with Terry Taylor
World Wrestling Alliance
WWA Heavyweight Championship (1 time)

References

1949 births
Male actors from St. Louis
African-American male professional wrestlers
American male professional wrestlers
Living people
Professional wrestlers from Missouri
21st-century African-American people
20th-century African-American sportspeople
GWF North American Heavyweight Champions
20th-century professional wrestlers
21st-century professional wrestlers
GWF Tag Team Champions